KBLB (93.3 FM, "B93.3") is a radio station broadcasting a country music format. Licensed to Nisswa, Minnesota, United States, the station serves the Brainerd area. The station is owned by Hubbard Broadcasting, Inc. (through licensee HBI Radio Brainerd/Wadena, LLC) and features programming from Westwood One.

KBLB is a sister station to KVBR 1340 (Business News/Talk), KLIZ 1380 (Sports), KUAL-FM 103.5 (Oldies), WJJY-FM 106.7 (Adult Contemporary), and KLIZ-FM 107.5 (Classic Rock). All are located in a brand new modern broadcast facility located at 13225 Dogwood Drive, Baxter.

History
The Federal Communications Commission issued a construction permit for the station to BDI Broadcasting, Inc. on 1999-08-05 and assigned it the call sign KBPQ. On 2000-12-11, BDI assigned the permit to BL Broadcasting (both companies were subsidiaries of Omni Broadcasting). On 2002-01-23, the station changed its call sign to the current KBLB. The station received its license to cover on 2002-03-28.

Hubbard Broadcasting announced on November 13, 2014 that it would purchase the Omni Broadcasting stations, including KBLB. The sale was completed on February 27, 2015, at a purchase price of $8 million for the 16 stations and one translator.

References

External links

Radio stations in Minnesota
Country radio stations in the United States
Radio stations established in 2002
2002 establishments in Minnesota
Hubbard Broadcasting